Ferry Training Unit is a former Royal Air Force unit which operated between 1952 and 1958 to train ferry flight pilots. The unit was formed by a series of replacements, disbandments and mergers dating back to 1939.

History

 Ferry Flight, Cardington
 No. 2 Ferry Pilots Pool
 No. 4 Ferry Pilots Pool
 Headquarters Service Ferry Pools/Squadron
 Service Ferry Training Squadron
 Ferry Training Unit
 Ferry Training and Despatch Unit
 Ferry Training Unit

Aircraft types ferried

References

Bibliography

Training Unit 00